The Act LXXIX of 2021 on taking more severe action against paedophile offenders and amending certain Acts for the protection of children, often mentioned in English-language media as Hungary's anti-LGBT law are legislative amendments that were approved by the Hungarian Parliament on 15 June 2021, on a 157–1 vote. It was condemned by human rights groups and left-wing Hungarian opposition parties as discriminatory against the LGBT community. The EU and the United States consider the amendments to be discriminatory anti-LGBT restrictions. By contrast, most Eastern European EU countries did not take a public stance, apart from Poland, which supported the Hungarian position.

After the law was passed, the European Commission started infringement proceedings against Hungary for breaching guarantees of freedom of expression and non-discrimination in the EU Charter of Fundamental Rights.

History 

In April 2012, Jobbik, then a far-right nationalist party, tried to introduce a bill into the Hungarian parliament that would change the national constitution to allegedly "protect public morals and the mental health of the young generations" by banning the popularization of "sexual deviancy". The legislation was drafted by party spokesman Ádám Mirkóczki. This was to target "homosexuality, sex changes, transvestitism, bisexuality and paedophile behaviour". The proposed amendments would criminalise anyone who "popularizes their sexual relations—deviancy—with another person of the same sex, or other disturbances of sexual behaviour, before the wider public". The penalty would be three years in prison, or five years if 'popularizing' is done in front of minors. The draft legislation ultimately failed to pass.

The amendments 

In May and June 2021, the National Assembly of Hungary was debating a new law supposed to better protect children from paedophiles by taking stricter action against paedophile criminals. On the parliamentary session of 15 June 2021, Fidesz MP Csaba Hende, Chairman of the Legislative Committee in the Hungarian Parliament and Deputy Speaker for Legislation, submitted legislative amendments to the law that banned sharing information with minors that are considered to be promoting homosexuality or gender reassignment and to restrict LGBT representation in the media by banning content depicting LGBT topics from daytime television and prohibiting companies from running campaigns in solidarity with the LGBT community. In addition, it also declared that only individuals and organisations listed in an official register can provide sexual education classes in schools. According to a government spokesperson who made a statement after the legislation had been approved, the latter measures were to target "organisations with dubious professional background … often established for the representation of specific sexual orientations".

Members of the left-wing opposition parties (Hungarian Socialist Party, Democratic Coalition, LMP - Hungary's Green Party and Dialogue for Hungary), as well as some independent MPs such as Bernadett Szél, Ákos Hadházy and Szabolcs Szabó boycotted the session and didn't participate in the vote. The MPs who were present almost unanimously approved the legislation on a 157–1 vote. All present members of the ruling Fidesz party and of the right-wing opposition parties Jobbik and Mi Hazánk, as well as some independent MPs such as Imre Ritter voted in favour. Independent MP Sándor Székely voted against. The law went into effect on 7 July 2021.

On 6 August 2021, an implementing regulation was issued and published in the official journal of Hungary (Magyar Közlöny) that declared that products intended for children that display or promote deviation from one's birth gender identity, gender reassignment or homosexuality and products portraying sexuality in a self-serving way must be sold separately from other products and in closed packaging and must not be placed in a store's window. Such products also must not be sold within two hundred metres (approximately 656 feet) of any entrances of educational institutions, premises of child and youth protection services, churches and other places dedicated to the practice of religion. The new legislation will enter into force thirty days from its issuing, and compliance will be monitored by the consumer protection authorities.

Reactions

Reactions in Hungary 

The amendments sparked a series of protests in Hungary by members and supporters of the LGBT community and by human rights groups. A petition and letter were written to President János Áder of Hungary, urging him not to sign the law. The online petition had been signed more than ten thousand times as of 7 August 2021.

The human rights group Amnesty International Hungary also asked people to sign its own petition made together with Budapest Pride, Háttér Society, Labrisz Leszbikus Egyesület, the Hungarian Helsinki Committee and TASZ (the Hungarian Civil Liberties Union) and supported by the LGBTQ section of the Hungarian Psychological Society, asking ombudsman Dr Ákos Kozma to send the law to the Constitutional Court of Hungary. The latter petition had been signed over eleven thousand times as of 7 August 2021.

International reactions 

The bill was met with immediate condemnation from high-ranking officials of several EU countries and groups of the European Parliament. On 22 June 2021, the law was discussed in the Council of the European Union. In total, sixteen out of twenty-seven states condemned it, with Belgium, the Netherlands and Luxembourg issuing a critical statement that called the law a breach of the Charter of Fundamental Rights of the European Union, and urged the European Commission to use all the tools at its disposal to ensure compliance with European laws, including recourse to the European Court of Justice. The statement was immediately endorsed by Denmark, Estonia, Finland, France, Germany, Ireland, Lithuania, Spain, Sweden and Latvia, by Italy at the end of the meeting and by Austria and Greece on the following day. In a response to the statement, Hungarian Foreign Minister Péter Szijjártó dismissed all negative opinions and urged critics to read the law in its entirety. According to Zoltán Kovács, Secretary of State for International Relations wrote in an opinion piece on Euronews.com that according to the law only parents should decide sexual education of their children.

The president of European Commission, Ursula von der Leyen expressed concern and tweeted: "I believe in a Europe which embraces diversity, not one which hides it from our children. No one should be discriminated on the basis of sexual orientation".

The Embassy of the United States in Budapest expressed deep concern about Hungary's law being anti-LGBT and stated: "The United States stands for the idea that governments should promote freedom of expression and protect human rights, including the rights of members of the LGBTQI+ community".

United Nations Secretary-General António Guterres stated: "No discrimination is acceptable in any circumstances, and any discrimination against LGBTIQ+ people is totally unacceptable in our modern societies".

On 25 June 2021, the new Hungarian legislation was heavily discussed at a summit of the leaders of the EU.  Dutch Prime Minister Mark Rutte told Prime Minister of Hungary Viktor Orbán: "If you don't like it, there is also an alternative: leave the [European] Union". French President Emmanuel Macron said the law "doesn't seem to me in line with our values" and he hoped it could be changed through dialogue. Prime Minister Xavier Bettel of Luxembourg said he would tell Prime Minister Viktor Orbán he was wrong to conflate homosexuality with paedophilia within the law. Polish ambassador to Germany Andrzej Przylebski argued that it was "evident and beyond doubt" that the Hungarian parliament had the right to protect schoolchildren by law from having to deal with issues such as homosexuality and said: "This has nothing to do with intolerance, let alone persecuting homosexuals".

In Romania in August 2021, the Eurosceptic party Alliance for the Union of Romanians (AUR), which has been described as far-right, proposed a similar law to the Hungarian law. This was also supported by the Hungarian-Romanian Democratic Alliance of Hungarians in Romania (RMDSZ), the Hungarian People's Party of Transylvania and the Hungarian Civic Party (Romania).

During the 2020 UEFA European Championship 
On 23 June 2021, the German men's national football team was to host the Hungarian team at the Allianz Arena in Munich as part of the 2020 UEFA European Championship. A petition was started that asked Jürgen Muth, manager of the Allianz Arena, Aleksander Čeferin, president of the UEFA, Fritz Keller, president of the German Football Association and Andreas Jung, director of FC Bayern Munich to light the arena with rainbow colours in solidarity with the LGBT community of Hungary and in protest against the law.
The petition was signed over three hundred thousand times, but it was rejected by the UEFA that issued a statement saying that "UEFA (...) is a politically and religiously neutral organization. Given the political context of this specific request ― a message aiming at a decision taken by the Hungarian national parliament ― UEFA must decline this request." Instead, they suggested that the arena be lit up on another day. Mayor Dieter Reiter of Munich called the decision "shameful", while Foreign Minister Péter Szijjártó of Hungary welcomed the decision as a sign of "common sense".

The city of Munich lit up its town hall and several other landmarks in rainbow colours to protest the decision, alongside several German football clubs illuminating their stadiums with a rainbow flag for the duration of the game.

Human rights 
In July 2021, the European Commission started infringement proceedings against Hungary for breaching guarantees of freedom of expression and non-discrimination in the EU Charter of Fundamental Rights. The Hungarian government announced a referendum on the law which was held on 3 April 2022. The share of valid votes on the referendum was below the required 50%, thus it became invalid but the law remained in force. 

In December 2021, the Venice Commission released its findings that the law conflicted with the European Convention on Human Rights and other international human rights standards. The law was too vague to meet the requirement of foreseeability, infringed on the right of freedom of expression, and discriminated on the basis of sexual orientation and gender identity.

European Union infringement procedures 
On 15 July 2021, the EU Commission announced it had opened infringement procedures by sending a letter of formal notice. On 2 December, the EU Commission announced it had sent a reasoned opinion to Hungary.

Aftermath and effects on the Hungarian LGBT community 
A report by RTL Hungary based on data provided by Hungarian LGBTQI civil organisation, Háttér Society, there was a surge in attacks motivated by homophobia against members of the LGBT community after the introduction of the new law. The report added that verbal aggression was the most frequent, with some conflicts escalating into threats of violence and even committing violent acts against LGBT people or harming their property.

See also 
 Russian gay propaganda law
 LGBT rights in Europe
 LGBT rights in Hungary
 LGBT rights in the European Union
 LGBT sex education
 Education and the LGBT community

References

External links 
 Full text of the law 
 Translation of the law (in English)

2021 in Hungary
Censorship in Hungary
Discrimination against LGBT people
LGBT-related legislation
LGBT rights in Hungary
Law of Hungary
Homophobia
Censorship of LGBT issues
LGBT-related controversies in Hungary
June 2021 events in Hungary
Sexuality in Hungary
2021 in LGBT history
Hungary and the European Union
Anti-LGBT sentiment